The Atlantic Building (Edificio Atlantic) is a condominium building of 25 floors located on Calle D between 1st. and 3rd, in Vedado, Havana. It is located in a privileged area near the Malecon. It the first building erected by the Cuban-Italian mixed enterprise Azul Inmobiliaria, founded in 1999 in partnership with the Italian partner B & D International and is a holding company with franchised in Cuba where it is known as Inversiones Punta del Morro. Construction began in 2000 and was inaugurated on February 10, 2007. It is considered a symbol of Cuban modern architecture.

Structure

It consists of the lobby on the ground floor along with an office, 5 floors of parking, a terrace and pool on the sixth floor. The 96 apartments are spread across 15 levels from the eighth floor at the rate of 6 per floor. At level 23 there are several pools and technical facilities in 24 and 25. Also part of the whole a side building of 5 floors, with three shopping centers and six dwellings.

Materials
The project used cantilevered beams of post-tensioned concrete and rebar with a high yield strength (up to 600 MPa) and strands with high yield strengths of 1900 MPa. The materials have undergone in-depth studies because the building is located in an area near the sea and likely to receive high winds and storm surges when the city is hit by a hurricane.

Design
The architecture was designed by a team of Italian experts of the MSC firm, while the structural design for the different facilities was developed by the Cuban company DCH (Diseño Ciudad Habana).

Facilities
With views of the Straits of Florida and the city, its guestroom services include: HVAC, lighting, fax, phone, TV cable, video intercom, fast elevators, internal security, intrusion systems, emergency. Complemented with hire facilities (Havanautos), package delivery as CUBAPACK or DHL.

References

Buildings and structures in Havana
Residential buildings completed in 2007
21st-century architecture in Cuba